Miss Universe 1977, the 26th Miss Universe pageant, was held on 16 July 1977 at the National Theater in Santo Domingo, Dominican Republic. It was the first time in the pageant's history that the event was held in Dominican Republic. Janelle Commissiong of Trinidad and Tobago was crowned by Rina Messinger of Israel at the end of the event. This marks the first time a Black Woman won Miss Universe

Miss Universe was then owned by Gulf+Western Industries.

Results

Placements

Order Of Announcements

Top 12

Top 5

Contestants

  - Virginia Caroline Suka
  - Sheryl Ann Gibbons
  - Maritza Elizabet Jurado
  - Margareth Eldrid Oduber
  - Jill Maree Minaham
  - Eva Maria Duringer
  - Paulette Rosetta Ogylvie Borghardt
  - Margaret Sonia Rouse
  - Claudine Marie Vasseur
  - Dora Maria Phillips
  - Connie Marie Frith
  - Liliana Gutiérrez Paz
  - Cássia Janys Moraes Silveira
  - Andria Dolores Norman
  - Pamela Mercer
  - Priscilla Raquel Brenner
  - Aura María Mojica Salcedo
  - Claudia Maria Garnier Arias
  - Regine Tromp
  - Inge Eline Erlandsen
  - Blanca Aurora Sardiñas
  - Lucía del Carmen Hernández Quiñones
  - Altagracia Arévalo
  - Sarah Louise Long
  - Armi Aavikko †
  - Véronique Fagot
  - Evelyne Randel
  - Marie-Luise Gassen
  - Maria Spantidaki
  - Catherine Reinette
  - Lisa Ann Caso
  - Françoise Elie
  - Ineke Berends
  - Carolina Rosa Rauscher Sierra
  - Loletta Chu Ling-Ling
  - Kristjana Þrainsdóttir
  - Bineeta Bose
  - Siti Mirza Nuria Arifin
  - Jakki Moore
  - Zehava Vardi
  - Paola Biasini
  - Kyoko Sato
  - Kim Sung-hee
  - Hyam Saadé
  - Welma Albertine Wani Campbell
  - Leong Li Ping
  - Jane Benedicta Saliba
  - Danielle Marie Françoise Bouic
  - Felicia Mercado 
  - Donna Anne Schultze
  - Beatriz Obregón Lacayo 
  - Margarita Benavente Camacho
  - Åshild Jenny Ottesen
  - Marina Valenciano
  - Sayah Karakuru
  - María Leticia Zarza Perriet
  - María Isabel Frías Zavala
  - Anna Lorraine Tomas Kier
  - Maria del Mar Rivera
  - Yolaine Morel
  - Sandra Bell
  - Marilyn Choon May Sim
  - Glynis Dorothea Fester
  - Luz María Polegre Hernández
  - Sobodhini Nagesan
  - Annette Emelda Frank
  - Iva-Lua Mendes
  - Marie Madeleine Boirard
  - Marlene Roesmienten Saimo
  - Birgitta Lindvall
  - Anja Kristin Terzi
  Tahiti - Donna Aunoa
  - Laddawan Intriya
  - Janelle Commissiong
  - Adriana María Umpierre Escudero
  - Kimberly Tomes
  - Cristal Montañez
  - Denise Naomi George
  - Christine Anne Murphy
  - Ljiljana Sobajić

Notes

Debuts

Returns
Last competed in 1962:
  Tahiti
Last competed in 1975:

Withdrawals
  - Marta Elisa Tirado Richardson
  - Jeannette Henriette Colling
  - Manolya Onur † was disqualified for competing twice.

Did not Compete
  - Patricia Vatble

Awards
  - Miss Amity (Pamela Mercer)
  - Miss Photogenic (Janelle Commissiong)
  - Best National Costume (Kim Sung-hee)

General references

External links
 Miss Universe official website

1977
1977 beauty pageants
1977 in the Dominican Republic
Beauty pageants in the Dominican Republic
July 1977 events in North America